The bronzy hermit (Glaucis aeneus) is a species of hummingbird in the family Trochilidae. It is found in Colombia, Costa Rica, Ecuador, Honduras, Nicaragua, and Panama.

Taxonomy and systematics

The bronzy hermit and the rufous-breasted hermit (G. hirsutus) have been considered conspecific but now are treated as a superspecies. The bronzy hermit is monotypic although the separate Central and South American populations have sometimes been treated as subspecies.

Description

Males weigh  and females . The male's bill is decurved and the maxilla has serrated edges. The female's bill has more curve and no serrations. The sexes' plumages are alike, with bronzy or coppery green upperparts, deep buff thoat and breast, and pale buff belly. The face has a white "moustache" and is otherwise dusky. The upperside of the tail is gray-green with white tips and the underside reddish near the body, blackish in the middle, and white at the tips. The Central American population has slightly longer wings than the South American but their plumages are identical.

Distribution and habitat

The bronzy hermit has two separate populations. One is found from eastern Honduras through eastern Nicaragua and eastern and western Costa Rica into western Panama. The other is found from western Colombia into northwestern Ecuador as far south as Pichincha Province. The species inhabits semi-open landscapes such as disturbed primary forest, mature secondary forest, swamp forest, and shrublands.

Behavior

Movement

The bronzy hermit is believed to be non-migratory throughout its range.

Feeding

The bronzy hermit feeds on nectar at Heliconia and other plants. Small arthropods are also eaten; the latter are usually hover-gleaned from spider webs, leaves, and twigs, and occasionally caught in flight.

Breeding

The bronzy hermit's breeding season varies geographically by has not been fully defined. Its nest is a cone-shaped cup made of plant fibers bound with spider web and decorated with lichens, attached to the underside of a drooping leaf. The clutch size is two eggs.

Vocalization

The bronzy hermit's song is "a high-pitched descending phrase 'tsee-tsee-tsi-tsi-tsitstitsi' irregularly altered with a series of high-pitched 'seee' notes". Its flight call is "a sharp high-pitched 'tzeeet!'."

Status

The IUCN has assessed the bronzy hermit as being of Least Concern, though its population number and trend are not known. It occurs in several protected areas, and is deemed "very common" in Colombia.

References

Additional reading

A Guide to the Birds of Costa Rica by F. Gary Stiles and Alexander F. Skutch 
Hummingbirds of Costa Rica by Michael Fogden and Patricia Fogden

External links
Stamps (with RangeMap)

bronzy hermit
Hummingbird species of Central America
Birds of Nicaragua
Birds of Costa Rica
Birds of the Tumbes-Chocó-Magdalena
bronzy hermit